Willis, Virginia can refer to:

Willis, Floyd County, Virginia
Willis, Russell County, Virginia